The 2005 World Group II Play-offs were four ties which involved the losing nations of the World Group II and four nations from the three Zonal Group I competitions. Nations that won their play-off ties entered the 2006 World Group II, while losing nations joined their respective zonal groups.

Puerto Rico vs. Indonesia

Japan vs. Bulgaria

Thailand vs. Slovakia

China vs. Slovenia

References

See also
Fed Cup structure

World Group II Play-offs